The Baby Tooth Survey was initiated by the Greater St. Louis Citizens' Committee for Nuclear Information in conjunction with Saint Louis University and the Washington University School of Dental Medicine as a means of determining the effects of nuclear fallout in the human anatomy by examining the levels of radioactive material absorbed into the deciduous teeth of children.

Founded by the husband and wife team of physicians Eric and Louise Reiss, along with other scientists such as Barry Commoner and Ursula Franklin, the research focused on detecting the presence of strontium-90, a cancer-causing radioactive isotope created by the more than 400 atomic tests conducted above ground that is absorbed from water and dairy products into the bones and teeth given its chemical similarity to calcium. The team sent collection forms to schools in the St. Louis, Missouri area, hoping to gather 50,000 teeth each year. The school-aged children were encouraged to mail in their newly lost baby teeth by colorful posters displayed in classrooms, and the reward of a colorful button. Ultimately over 320,000 teeth were donated by children of various ages. The project was ended in 1970.

Preliminary results published by the team in the November 24, 1961, edition of the journal Science showed that levels of strontium 90 in children had risen steadily in children born in the 1950s, with those born later showing the most increased levels. The results of a more comprehensive study of the elements found in the teeth collected showed that children born in 1963 had levels of strontium 90 in their baby teeth that were 50 times higher than those found in children born in 1950, before the advent of large-scale atomic testing. The findings helped convince U.S. President John F. Kennedy to sign the Partial Nuclear Test Ban Treaty with the United Kingdom and Soviet Union, which ended the above-ground nuclear weapons testing that placed the greatest amounts of nuclear fallout into the atmosphere.

Background

According to Irish scientist Kathleen Lonsdale, in the mid-1950s or earlier it was known that strontium 90 is taken up particularly easily by children, that it causes bone tumors, and that "according to the British and American official reports, some children in both countries have already accumulated a measurable amount of radioactive strontium in their bodies."

Follow-up analysis
A set of 85,000 teeth that had been uncovered in storage in 2001 by Washington University were given to the Radiation and Public Health Project. By tracking 3,000 individuals who had participated in the tooth-collection project, the RPHP published results that showed that the 12 children who later died of cancer before the age of 50 had levels of strontium 90 in their stored baby teeth that were twice the levels of those who were still alive at 50. The U.S. Nuclear Regulatory Commission reports that these finding are seriously flawed and that the Radiation and Public Health Project has not followed good scientific practice in the conducting of these studies, in particular confusing correlation for causation and incorrectly conflating risk from nuclear weapon testing fallout with radiation from nuclear power plants.

Related projects
The Baby Tooth Survey inspired a number of similar initiatives in other parts of the world. For example, what became known as the Tooth Fairy Project was developed in South Africa by Dr. Anthony Turton and his team at the Council for Scientific and Industrial Research (CSIR) in order to determine whether human health impacts arising from radioactivity and heavy metal pollution downstream from gold mining activities, driven by acid mine drainage, was occurring.

A number of related studies by the Radiation and Public Health Project assert that levels of radioactive strontium-90 (Sr-90) are rising in the environment and that these increased levels are responsible for increases in cancers, particularly cancers in children, and infant mortality. The group also made the claim that radioactive effluents from nuclear power plants are directly responsible for the increases in Sr-90. In one study, researchers reported that Sr-90 concentrations in baby teeth are higher in areas around nuclear power plants than in other areas. However, numerous peer-reviewed, scientific studies do not substantiate such claims. This has also sometimes been referred to as “The Tooth Fairy Project.”

Similar baby tooth studies

In early 1970s Herbert Needleman used baby teeth in the same way that Barry Commoner did but for testing lead levels instead of strontium-90.

Dr. Mona Hanna-Attisha, a pediatrician who helped expose the Flint Water Crisis, has been promoting a similar study to track lead levels in the local children.  Per the news coverage, "She expects the forthcoming report to include information on the initial results of brain assessments of children exposed to Flint water and early results of testing baby teeth of Flint children to measure their exposure to lead."

References

Radiation health effects research
Research projects
Research in the United States
Saint Louis University
Washington University in St. Louis
Surveys (human research)
Teeth